Apocalypse of Ezra may refer to:
The Jewish Apocalypse of Ezra, more commonly known as 4 Esdras or 2 Esdras.
The Greek Apocalypse of Ezra